Advisory Neighborhood Commissions (ANCs) are bodies of local government in the District of Columbia, the capital city of the United Statesdistrict. The ANC system was created in 1974 through a referendum (73 percent voted "yes") in the District of Columbia Home Rule Act. The first elections for Advisory Neighborhood Commissioners were held in the fall of 1975, and commissions began operating in 1976. Congressman Don Fraser (D-Minn) and D.C. resident Milton Kotler helped to draft the ANC language in the Home Rule Act based on the success of Adams Morgan Organization (AMO) in Adams Morgan and on a 1970 report of the Minneapolis Citizen League, as well as on related neighborhood corporations in Pittsburgh; Brooklyn, New York; Chicago; and Columbus, Ohio. 

ANCs consider a wide range of policies and programs affecting their neighborhoods, including traffic, parking, recreation, street improvements, liquor licenses, zoning, economic development, police protection, sanitation and trash collection, and the district's annual budget. Commissioners serve two-year terms and receive no salary, but commissions do receive funds for the general purpose of improving their area and hiring staff. This policy has come under scrutiny because of the misuse of funds by commissioners and their employees. Candidates can accept campaign donations up to $25 per person.

Powers

The powers of the ANC system are enumerated by the DC Code § 1-207.38:

 May advise the District government on matters of public policy including decisions regarding planning, streets, recreation, social services programs, health, safety, and sanitation in that neighborhood commission area;
 May employ staff and expend, for public purposes within its neighborhood commission area, public funds and other funds donated to it; and
 Shall have such other powers and duties as may be provided by act of the Council.

The ANCs present their positions and recommendations on issues to various District government agencies, the Executive Branch, and the Council. They also present testimony to independent agencies, boards, and commissions, usually under the rules of procedure specific to those entities. By law, the ANCs may present their positions to Federal agencies. One of the most common cases of ANC involvement is in the giving of liquor licenses, where the approval or disapproval of the commission, despite having no legal power, represents a veto to the district government.

Membership and qualifications

Each ANC Commissioner is nominated and elected by the registered voters who reside in the same Single Member District as the candidate. The ANC Commissioner is an official representing her or his neighborhood community (Single Member District) on the Advisory Neighborhood Commission.

In order to hold the office of Advisory Neighborhood Commissioner, an individual must be a registered voter (or must be able to register to vote within two years) in the District, as defined by DC Code Section 1-1001.02; have resided continuously in the Single Member District from which they are nominated for the 60-day period immediately preceding the day on which the nominating petition is filed; and hold no other public office. In order to enter the public ballot, they must receive 25 signatures from registered voters in their district.

Single Member Districts

The basic area of Advisory Neighborhood Commissions are Single Member Districts. There are 299 Single Member Districts, which in turn are subdivisions of 39 'Commission Districts',  which are in turn subdivisions of Wards. Each Commissioner represents about 2,000 residents in their Single Member District (SMD) area.

Due to population growth and redistribution, these boundaries often change, causing shifts in power and election turnout.

Single Member Districts are named according to Ward, Subdivision, and then Single Member District. For instance, 3B05 is Ward 3, subdivision B, and SMD 05.

Ward 1 

 1A - Columbia Heights, Park View, Pleasant Plains
 1B - U Street, Cardozo, Howard University, Pleasant Plain, LeDroit Park, Shaw 
 1C - Adams Morgan, Kalorama Heights, Lanier Heights, Western U Street 
 1D - Mount Pleasant

Ward 2 

 2A - Foggy Bottom, West End
 2B - Dupont Circle
 2C - Chinatown, Penn Quarter
 2D - Kalorama, Sheridan
 2E - Burleith, Georgetown, Hillandale
 2F - Logan Circle

Ward 3 

 3B - Cathedral Heights, Glover Park
 3C - Cathedral Heights, Cleveland Park, Massachusetts Heights, McLean Gardens, Woodley Park
 3D - American University, Foxhall, Kent, The Palisades, Spring Valley, Wesley Heights
 3E - American University Park, Friendship Heights, Tenleytown, Wakefield, Chevy Chase, Ft Gaines
 3F - Forest Hills, North Cleveland Park, Tenleytown, Wakefield
 3/4G - Chevy Chase

Ward 4 

 4A - Brightwood, Colonial Village, Crestwood, Shepherd Park, Sixteenth Street Heights
 4B - Brightwood, Lamond-Riggs, Manor Park, Riggs Park, South Manor Park, Takoma, Fort Stevens Ridge
 4C - Columbia Heights, Petworth, Sixteenth Street Heights
 4D - Petworth, Brightwood Park

Ward 5 

 5A - North Michigan Park, Michigan Park, Fort Totten, Pleasant Hills, Fort Totten Park, parts of Catholic University and other Catholic Institutions, parts of Riggs Park
 5B - Brookland, University Heights, parts of Woodridge, parts of Queens Chapel, parts of Michigan Park
 5C - Langdon, Fort Lincoln, Brentwood, Arboretum, Gateway, Mt. Olivet Cemetery
 5D - Carver Langston, Trinidad, Gallaudet University, Ivy City, Capital City Market
 5E - Bloomingdale, Edgewood, Eckington, Truxton Circle, Glenwood/St. Mary's Cemeteries, McMillan Sand Filtration Site

Ward 6 

 6A - North Lincoln Park, Rosedale, H St. corridor (eastern half)
 6B - Barney Circle, Capitol Hill (southern half), Eastern Market
 6C - Near Northeast, NoMa, Union Station, H St. corridor (western half)
 6D - Carrollsburg, Fort McNair, Navy Yard, Near Southwest/Southeast, Waterfront
 6E - Shaw, Northwest One, and Mount Vernon Triangle

Ward 7 

 7B - Dupont Park, Fairfax Village, Greenway (part), Hillcrest, Naylor Gardens, Penn Branch, Randle Highlands, Twining
 7C - Benning Heights, Burrville, Deanwood, Grant Park, Lincoln Heights
 7D - Eastland Gardens, Kenilworth, Kingman Park, Mayfair, River Terrace
 7E - Benning Ridge (part), Capitol View, Fort Davis, Marshall Heights
 7F - Benning Ridge (part), Fort Dupont, Greenway (part)

Ward 8 

 8A - Anacostia, Fairlawn, Fort Stanton, Hillsdale
 8B - Garfield Heights, Knox Hill, Shipley Terrace
 8C - Barry Farm, Bolling Air Force Base, Congress Heights, St. Elizabeths Hospital
 8D - Bellevue, Far Southwest
 8E - Congress Heights, Valley Green, Washington Highlands

Members 
There currently exist 16 vacancies across all the 345 single member districts.

ANC 1A

 Max Ewart
 Dieter Lehmann Morales
 Carlo Perri
 Jeremy Sherman
 Stephen Coleman Kenny
 Brandolon Barnett
 Mukta Ghorpadey
 David Segall
 James A. Turner
 Billy Easley

ANC 1B

 Larry Handerhan
 Sean Holihan
 Jamie S. Sycamore
 Santiago Lakatos
 Alan Kensek
 Mark N. Johnson
 Ashleigh Fields
 Sabel Harris
 Tucker Jones

ANC 1C

 Vacant
 Lee Dixon
 Peter Wood
 Joseph Van Wye
 Margaret Stevens
 Lynda Laughlin
 Jake Faleschini
 Barney R Shapiro
 John Jones

ANC 1D

 Kelly Willis
 Hannah Grigg
 Erika Nunez
 Yasmin Romero
 Omar Parbhoo
 Angela Allison
 Gary Decker

ANC 1E

 Bradley Gallagher
 Bobbie Lancaster
 Michael Wray
 Rashida Brown
 Philip Newland
 Josh Jacobson
 Brian Footer

ANC 2A

 Yannik Omictin
 Jim Malec
 Trupti "Trip" Patel
 Ed Comer
 Kimberly S. Courtney
 Joel Causey
 Dasia Bandy
 Jordan Nassar
 Evelyn Hudson

ANC 2B

 Meg Roggensack
 Jeffrey Rueckgauer
 Vincent E. Slatt
 China Dickerson
 Z Stein
 Matt Johnson
 Patricia Bencivenga
 Zachary Adams
 Christopher Davis

ANC 2C

 Michael D. Shankle
 Rebecca Strauss
 Thomas S. Lee
 Kristin Roe

ANC 2D

 Ashley Warren
 Carole L. Feld

ANC 2E

 Kishan Kumar Putta
 Christopher "Topher" Mathews
 Paul Maysak
 Joseph Massaua
 Mimsy Lindner
 Gwendolyn Lohse
 Elizabeth H. Miller
 John Di Pierri

ANC 2F

 David R. Rubenstein
 Neil Rocklin
 Joe Florio
 Brian J. McCabe
 Christopher Dyer
 Matthew Fouracre
 Brant J. Miller
 Caroline Zagraniczny

ANC 2G

 Anthony "Tony" Brown
 Alexander M. "Alex" Padro
 Alex Lopez
 Steven Mccarty
 Sheena Berry
 Rachelle P. Nigro

ANC 3A

 Thaddeus Bradley-Lewis
 Judy Havemann
 Hans B. Miller
 Jeremy Del Moral
 Ann Lane Mladinov

ANC 3B

 Kevin Lavezzo
 Jackie Blumenthal
 Melissa Lane
 J. Kevin Carroll
 Gupi Howie
 Ben Bergmann

ANC 3C

 Hayden Gise
 Adam J. Prinzo
 Janell Marie Pagats
 Roric McCorristin
 Sauleh Ahmad Siddiqui
 Tammy Gordon
 Gawain Kripke
 Rick Nash

ANC 3D

 Chuck Elkins
 Tricia Duncan
 Quentin Colón Roosevelt
 Jeremy Joseph
 Bernie Horn
 Marilyn Nowalk
 J. P. Szymkowicz

ANC 3E

 Matthew Cohen
 Amy B Hall
 Jonathan Bender
 Tom Quinn
 Jeffrey Denny
 Alexandra Gianinno
 Diego Carney
 Rohin Ghosh

ANC 3F

 Ryan Cudemus-Brunoli
 Teri Huet
 Mitchell Baer
 Claudette David
 James Tandaric
 Courtney Carlson

ANC 3/4G

 Lisa R. Gore
 Bruce Sherman
 James Nash
 Michael Zeldin
 Peter Lynch
 Peter Gosselin
 Zachary Ferguson

ANC 4A

 Paula Y. Edwards
 Joan Hoyte
 Stephen A. "Steve" Whatley
 Patience R. Singleton
 Kim Patterson
 Vacant
 Zack Bolton

ANC 4B

 T. Michelle Colson
 Erin Palmer
 Zurick T. Smith
 Evan Yeats
 Kevin Gilligan
 Tiffani Nichole Johnson
 Michael Cohen
 Alison Brooks
 Audrey Walker
 Laroya A. Huff

ANC 4C

 Casey Swegman
 Antoine M. Kirby
 Thomas P. DeFranco
 Daniel Alexander
 Brittany Kademian
 Karen Livingston
 Matthew Bradfield

ANC 4D

 Joy A. Pinkney
 Kate Judson
 Carson C. Lucarelli
 Chrysanthe "CC" Courniotes
 Stephen Marencic Jr.
 Aman George
 J. Clark Weigel
 Anthony Pirrotti

ANC 4E

 Vanessa Rubio
 Marlene Hunt Moss
 Maria Barry
 Carla Ferris
 Ulysses E. Campbell
 Pavan Ishwar Khoobchandani

ANC 5A

 Duvalier J. Malone
 Karlus Cozart
 Emily Singer Lucio
 Diego Rojas
 Vacant
 Kweku A. Toure
 Vacant
 Gordon Fletcher
 Zachary Ammerman

ANC 5B

 Edward Borrego
 Nandini Sen
 Vacant
 Ra Amin
 Colleen Costello
 Sukhprita "Prita" Piekara
 Gail A. Brevard

ANC 5C

 Anthony Dale
 Lauren Rogers
 Tequia Hicks Delgado
 Jacqueline Manning
 Darlene Oliver
 Harry "Tommy" Thomas Jr.
 VJ Kapur

ANC 5D

 Vacant
 Sebrena L. Rhodes
 Anna Roblin
 Stephen Cobb
 Salvador Sauceda-Guzman
 Kathy Henderson
 Juan McCullum
 Reid May
 Bernice Blacknell

ANC 5E

 Joyce Robinson-Paul
 Karla M. Lewis
 Fred "Phil" Carver
 Huma Imtiaz
 Kevin Rapp
 Kirby Vining

ANC 5F

 Tony Hurst
 Aru Sahni
 Patricia Williams
 Mark Galvan
 Jennifer Anderson
 Joe Bishop-Henchman
 Sylvia M. Pinkney

ANC 6A

 Keya Chatterjee
 Mike Velasquez
 Roberta Shapiro
 Amber Gove
 Laura L Gentile
 Robb Dooling
 Stephen Moilanen

ANC 6B

 Frank Avery
 Gerald "Jerry" Sroufe
 David Sobelsohn
 Francis "Frank" D'Andrea
 Kasie Durkit
 Chander Jayaraman
 Vince Mareino
 Edward Ryder
 Matt LaFortune

ANC 6C

 Christy Kwan
 Leslie Merkle
 Jay Adelstein
 Mark Eckenwiler
 Joel Kelty
 Patricia Eguino
 Tony T Goodman

ANC 6D

 Bob Link
 Ronald Collins
 Gail Fast
 Andrea M. Pawley
 Ashton Rohmer
 Bruce Levine
 Fredrica "Rikki" Kramer
 Rhonda Natalie Hamilton

ANC 6E

 Chris Hart
 George Viedma
 Kevin M. Rogers
 Denise E. Blackson
 Ahmad Abu-Khalaf
 Dylan Forest
 Vacant
 Vacant
 Ritanch Hans

ANC 7B

 John F. Adams
 Jamaal Maurice Pearsall
 Travis R. Swanson
 D. L. Humphrey
 Donna Robinson
 Kelvin Earl Brown
 Lisa D. T. Rice
 Kelly Taylor
 Michelle Hammond

ANC 7C

 Brian A. Glover
 Patricia Williams
 Carlos Richardson
 Anthony Lorenzo Green
 Shirley A. Boykins
 Patricia Stamper
 Antawan Holmes
 Kimberly Martin
 Carrie N. Brown

ANC 7D

 Siraaj Hasan
 Vacant
 Wendell Felder
 Milton Hardy
 Ebony Payne
 Marc Friend
 Brett Astmann
 Brian Alcorn
 Ashley Schapitl
 Brianne Eby

ANC 7E

 Katrina Norman
 Krystal Bagley
 Vacant
 Natasha Dupee
 Timothy Howard
 Delia Houseal
 Evette (S.L.) Lang

ANC 7F

 Tyrell M. Holcomb
 Ashley Renee Ruff
 Kimory KSO Orendoff
 Vacant
 Brittany N. Hughes
 Vacant
 Shirley Thompson-Wright
 Leonard Eugene Bishop

ANC 8A

 Tonya Crawford
 Barbara J. Clark
 Holly Muhammad
 Laneice Moore
 Jamila White
 Robin McKinney
 Laverne Glenn

ANC 8B

 Khadijah Watson
 Paul Trantham
 Vacant
 Kimberly Little
 Joseph Johnson
 Alyce McFarland
 Vacant

ANC 8C

 Georgette Joy Johnson
 Joyce M. Doyle
 Dascha Cleckley
 Erica "Go" Green
 Cheryl Moore
 Robbie Woodland
 Salim Adofo
 Amanda Beale

ANC 8D

 Jacqueline Kinlow
 Vacant
 Sandra Harrell
 Tara Brown
 Travon Hawkins
 Wendy Hamilton
 Natasha Yates
 Lakiah Williams

ANC 8E

 Deborah Wells
 Laqueda Tate
 Kelly Mikel Williams
 Kendall Simmons
 Duane A. Moody
 Dolores "Miracle" Bryant
 Vacant
 Rowena "Joyce" Scott
 Rhonda K. Holmes

ANC 8F

 Nic Wilson
 Rick Murphree
 Brian Strege
 Edward Daniels
 Clayton Rosenberg

2022 Election 

The 2022 Advisory Neighborhood Commissioner election was held on November 8, 2022. Elections were held to fill the seats of 345 single-member districts across the 40 commissions.

Ward 1

1A 
01
Candidates:
 Max Ewart,:
Declared:
Did not qualify for ballot:
Endorsements:

02
Candidates:
 Dieter Lehmann Morales, Patricia Bencivenga:
Declared:
Did not qualify for ballot:
Endorsements:

03
Candidates:
 Carlo Perri,:
Declared:
Did not qualify for ballot:
Endorsements:

04
Candidates:
 Jeremy Sherman,:
Declared:
Did not qualify for ballot:
Endorsements:

05
Candidates:
 Stephen Coleman Kenny,:
Declared:
Did not qualify for ballot:
Endorsements:

06
Candidates:
Declared:
Did not qualify for ballot:
 Ben Callanan,:
 Brandolon Barnett,:
Endorsements:

07
Candidates:
 Mukta Ghorpadey,:
Declared:
Did not qualify for ballot:
Endorsements:

08
Candidates:
 David Segall,:
Declared:
Did not qualify for ballot:
Endorsements:

09
Candidates:
 James A. Turner,:
Declared:
Did not qualify for ballot:
Endorsements:

10
Candidates:
 Billy Easley,:
 Dotti Love Wade,:
Declared:
Did not qualify for ballot:
 Elan Strait,:
Endorsements:

1B 
01
Candidates:
 Larry Handerhan,:
Declared:
Did not qualify for ballot:
Endorsements:

02
Candidates:
 Sean Holihan,:
Declared:
Did not qualify for ballot:
Endorsements:

03
Candidates:
 Jamie S. Sycamore,:
Declared:
Did not qualify for ballot:
Endorsements:

04
Candidates:
 Harry Quinton,:
 Santiago Lakatos,:
Declared:
Did not qualify for ballot:
Endorsements:

05
Candidates:
Declared:
 Lindsay Webb,:
Did not qualify for ballot:
 Deborah Thomas,:
Endorsements:

06
Candidates:
Declared:
Did not qualify for ballot:
Endorsements:

07
Candidates:
 Ashleigh Fields,:
Declared:
Did not qualify for ballot:
 J. Swiderski,:
Endorsements:

08
Candidates:
 Sabel Harris,:
Declared:
Did not qualify for ballot:
Endorsements:

09
Candidates:
 Tucker Jones,:
Declared:
Did not qualify for ballot:
Endorsements:

1C 
01
Candidates:
 Howard Bauleke,:
Declared:
Did not qualify for ballot:
Endorsements:

02
Candidates:
 Lee Dixon,:
Declared:
Did not qualify for ballot:
Endorsements:

03
Candidates:
 Peter Wood,:
Declared:
Did not qualify for ballot:
Endorsements:

04
Candidates:
 Joseph Van Wye,:
Declared:
Did not qualify for ballot:
Endorsements:

05
Candidates:
 Margaret Stevens,:
 Wilma B.Y. Jones,:
Declared:
Did not qualify for ballot:
Endorsements:

06
Candidates:
 Lynda Laughlin,:
Declared:
Did not qualify for ballot:
Endorsements:

07
Candidates:
 Ivan Taylor Jr.,:
 Jake Faleschini,:
 Nancy Shia,:
Declared:
Did not qualify for ballot:
Endorsements:

08
Candidates:
Declared:
Did not qualify for ballot:
Endorsements:

09
Candidates:
Declared:
Did not qualify for ballot:
Endorsements:

1D 
01
Candidates:
Declared:
Did not qualify for ballot:
Endorsements:

02
Candidates:
 Hannah Grigg,:
Declared:
Did not qualify for ballot:
Endorsements:

03
Candidates:
 Erika Nunez,:
Declared:
Did not qualify for ballot:
Endorsements:

04
Candidates:
 Yasmin Romero-Latin,:
Declared:
Did not qualify for ballot:
Endorsements:

05
Candidates:
 Omar Parbhoo,:
Declared:
Did not qualify for ballot:
 Greg Boyd,:
Endorsements:

06
Candidates:
 Robin Sandenburgh,:
 Angela Allison,:
Declared:
Did not qualify for ballot:
Endorsements:

07
Candidates:
 Anthony Barnes,:
Declared:
Did not qualify for ballot:
Endorsements:

1E 
01
Candidates:
 Kent C. Boese,:
Declared:
Did not qualify for ballot:
Endorsements:

02
Candidates:
 Bobbie Lancaster,:
Declared:
Did not qualify for ballot:
Endorsements:

03
Candidates:
 Michael Wray,:
Declared:
Did not qualify for ballot:
Endorsements:

04
Candidates:
 Mike McLaughlin,:
 Rashida Brown,:
Declared:
Did not qualify for ballot:
Endorsements:

05
Candidates:
Declared:
Did not qualify for ballot:
Endorsements:

06
Candidates:
 E. Gail Anderson Holness,:
 Josh Jacobson,:
Declared:
Did not qualify for ballot:
 Eric Jonathan Sheptok,:
Endorsements:

07
Candidates:
 Brian Footer,:
 Amanda Farnan,:
Declared:
Did not qualify for ballot:
Endorsements:

Ward 2

2A 
01
Candidates:
 Susana Barañano,:
 Yannik Omictin,:
Declared:
Did not qualify for ballot:
Endorsements:

02
Candidates:
 Jim Malec,:
Declared:
Did not qualify for ballot:
Endorsements:

03
Candidates:
 Trupti “Trip” J. Patel,:
Declared:
Did not qualify for ballot:
Endorsements:

04
Candidates:
 Carson Colton Robb,:
 Ed Comer,:
Declared:
Did not qualify for ballot:
 Donna Barbisch,:
Endorsements:

05
Candidates:
Declared:
Did not qualify for ballot:
 Bernard Kramer,:
Endorsements:

06
Candidates:
Declared:
Did not qualify for ballot:
 Joel Causey,:
Endorsements:

07
Candidates:
 Dasia Bandy,:
Declared:
Did not qualify for ballot:
 Adam Friend,:
Endorsements:

08
Candidates:
 Jordan Nassar,:
Declared:
Did not qualify for ballot:
Endorsements:

09
Candidates:
Write-In Candidates:
 Evelyn Hudson,:
Declared:
Did not qualify for ballot:
Endorsements:

2B 
01
Candidates:
 Meg Roggensack,:
Declared:
Did not qualify for ballot:
Endorsements:

02
Candidates:
 Jeff Rueckgauer,:
Declared:
Did not qualify for ballot:
Endorsements:

03
Candidates:
 Vincent E. Slatt,:
Declared:
Did not qualify for ballot:
Endorsements:

04
Candidates:
 China Dickerson,:
Declared:
Did not qualify for ballot:
Endorsements:

05
Candidates:
 Z Stein,:
Declared:
Did not qualify for ballot:
Endorsements:

06
Candidates:
 Matt Johnson,:
Declared:
Did not qualify for ballot:
Endorsements:

07
Candidates:
 Patricia Bencivenga,:
Declared:
Did not qualify for ballot:
 Bill Rubin,:
Endorsements:

08
Candidates:
 Thomas Reiter,:
 Zachary Adams,:
Declared:
Did not qualify for ballot:
Endorsements:

09
Candidates:
 Christopher Davis,:
Declared:
Did not qualify for ballot:
Endorsements:

2C 
01
Candidates:
 Michael D. Shankle,:
Declared:
Did not qualify for ballot:
Endorsements:

02
Candidates:
 Josette Barsano,:
 Rebecca Stauss,:
Declared:
Did not qualify for ballot:
Endorsements:

03
Candidates:
 Thomas S. Lee,:
Declared:
Did not qualify for ballot:
Endorsements:

04
Candidates:
Declared:
Did not qualify for ballot:
Endorsements:

2D 
01
Candidates:
 Ashley Warren,:
Declared:
Did not qualify for ballot:
Endorsements:

02
Candidates:
 Carole Feld,:
Declared:
Did not qualify for ballot:
Endorsements:

2E 
01
Candidates:
 Kishan Putta,:
Declared:
Did not qualify for ballot:
Endorsements:

02
Candidates:
 Christopher “Topher” Matthews,:
 Patrick Clawson,:
Declared:
Did not qualify for ballot:
Endorsements:

03
Candidates:
Declared:
Did not qualify for ballot:
Endorsements:

04
Candidates:
Declared:
Did not qualify for ballot:
Endorsements:

05
Candidates:
 Mimsy Lindner,:
Declared:
Did not qualify for ballot:
Endorsements:

06
Candidates:
 Gwendolyn Lohse,:
Declared:
Did not qualify for ballot:
Endorsements:

07
Candidates:
 Elizabeth H. Miller,:
Declared:
Did not qualify for ballot:
 Jacob A. Miller,:
Endorsements:

08
Candidates:
Declared:
Did not qualify for ballot:
Endorsements:

2F 
01
Candidates:
 David R. Rubenstein,:
Declared:
Did not qualify for ballot:
Endorsements:

02
Candidates:
 Neil Rocklin,:
Declared:
Did not qualify for ballot:
Endorsements:

03
Candidates:
Declared:
Did not qualify for ballot:
Endorsements:

04
Candidates:
 Brian J. McCabe,:
Declared:
Did not qualify for ballot:
Endorsements:

05
Candidates:
Declared:
Did not qualify for ballot:
Endorsements:

06
Candidates:
Write-In Candidates:
 Matthew Fouracre,:
Declared:
Did not qualify for ballot:
Endorsements:

07
Candidates:
 Brant J. Miller,:
Declared:
Did not qualify for ballot:
Endorsements:

08
Candidates
 Caroline Zagraniczny,::
Declared:
Did not qualify for ballot:
Endorsements:

2G 
01
Candidates:
 Tony Brown,:
 Zach Naimon,:
Declared:
Did not qualify for ballot:
Endorsements:

02
Candidates:
 Michael Eichler,:
 Alexander M. “Alex” Padro,:
Declared:
Did not qualify for ballot:
Endorsements:

03
Candidates:
 Alex Lopez,:
 :* Sranda Watkins,:,:
Declared:
Did not qualify for ballot:
Endorsements:

04
Candidates:
 Steven McCarthy,:
 Amanda Gore,:
 Fred Hill,:
Declared:
Did not qualify for ballot:
Endorsements:

05
Candidates:
 Sheena Berry,:
 Willie Doggett,:
Declared:
Did not qualify for ballot:
Endorsements:

06
Candidates:
 Rachelle P. Nigro,:
Declared:
Did not qualify for ballot:
 Carl Edgar Rhode III,:
Endorsements:

Ward 3

3A 
01
Candidates:
 Thaddeus Bradley-Lewis,:
Declared:
Did not qualify for ballot:
Endorsements:

02
Candidates:
Declared:
Did not qualify for ballot:
Endorsements:

03
Candidates:
 Hans B. Miller,:
Declared:
Did not qualify for ballot:
Endorsements:

04
Candidates:
 Jeremy Del Moral,:
Declared:
Did not qualify for ballot:
Endorsements:

05
Candidates:
 Ann Lane Mladinov,:
Declared:
Did not qualify for ballot:
Endorsements:

3B 
01
Candidates:
 Kevin Lavezzo,:
Declared:
Did not qualify for ballot:
Endorsements:

02
Candidates:
 Jackie Blumen,:
 Aileen Nowlan,:
 Ana Elizabeth Guzman,:
Declared:
Did not qualify for ballot:
Endorsements:

03
Candidates:
 Melissa Lane,:
Declared:
Did not qualify for ballot:
Endorsements:

04
Candidates:
Declared:
Did not qualify for ballot:
Endorsements:

05
Candidates:
 Gupi Howie,:
Declared:
Did not qualify for ballot:
Endorsements:

06
Candidates:
 Ben Bergmann,:
Declared:
Did not qualify for ballot:
Endorsements:

3C 
01
Candidates:
 Hayden Gise,:
Declared:
Did not qualify for ballot:
Endorsements:

02
Candidates:
 Glenn Kellogg,:
 Adam J. Prinzo,:
Declared:
Did not qualify for ballot:
Endorsements:

03
Candidates:
 Janell Pagats,:
Declared:
Did not qualify for ballot:
Endorsements:

04
Candidates:
 Roric McCorristin,:
Declared:
Did not qualify for ballot:
Withdrew::
 Beau Finley,:
Endorsements:

05
Candidates:
 Sauleh A. Siddiqui,:
 Nicholas Ide,:
Declared:
Did not qualify for ballot:
Endorsements:

06
Candidates:
 Tammy Gordon,:
 Justin Daniels,:
Declared:
Did not qualify for ballot:
Endorsements:

07
Candidates:
 Gawain Kripke,:
 Warren Gorlick,:
Declared:
Did not qualify for ballot:
Endorsements:

08
Candidates:
 Rick Nash,:
 Keith Mantel,:
Declared:
Did not qualify for ballot:
Endorsements:

3D 
01
Candidates:
 Chuck Elkins,:
Declared:
Did not qualify for ballot:
Endorsements:

02
Candidates:
 Tricia Duncan,:
Declared:
Did not qualify for ballot:
Endorsements:

03
Candidates:
 Paige Ela,:
 Quentin Colón Roosevelt,:
Declared:
Did not qualify for ballot:
Endorsements:

04
Candidates:
 Jeremy Joseph,:
Declared:
Did not qualify for ballot:
 Michael Sriqui,:
Endorsements:

05
Candidates:
 Bernard Horn,:
 Christopher J. Rosier,:
Declared:
Did not qualify for ballot:
Endorsements:

06
Candidates:
 Marilyn Nowalk,:
Declared:
Did not qualify for ballot:
 Wendy Lynch,:
Endorsements:

07
Candidates:
 J.P. Szymkowicz,:
Declared:
Did not qualify for ballot:
Endorsements:

3E 
01
Candidates:
 Matthew Cohen,:
Declared:
Did not qualify for ballot:
Endorsements:

02
Candidates:
 Amy B. Hall,:
Declared:
Did not qualify for ballot:
Endorsements:

03
Candidates:
 Jonathan Bender,:
Declared:
 Thomas Marabello,:
Did not qualify for ballot:
Endorsements:

04
 Earle Douglass,:
 Tom Quinn,:
Candidates:
Declared:
Did not qualify for ballot:
Endorsements:

05
Candidates:
 Jeffrey Denny,:
Declared:
Did not qualify for ballot:
Endorsements:

06
Candidates:
 Alexandra Gianino,:
Declared:
Did not qualify for ballot:
Endorsements:

07
Candidates:
Declared:
Did not qualify for ballot:
Endorsements:

08
Candidates:
Write-In Candidates:
 Rohin Ghosh,:
Declared:
Did not qualify for ballot:
Endorsements:

3F 
01
Candidates:
 Ryan Cudemas-Brunoli,:
Declared:
Did not qualify for ballot:
Endorsements:

02
Candidates:
 Kathy Hudson,:
 Teri Huet,:
Declared:
Did not qualify for ballot:
Endorsements:

03
Candidates:
 Mitchell Baer,:
Declared:
Did not qualify for ballot:
Endorsements:

04
Candidates:
 Claudette David,:
Declared:
Did not qualify for ballot:
Endorsements:

05
Candidates:
 James Tandaric,:
 Andrew Koval,:
Declared:
Did not qualify for ballot:
Endorsements:

06
Candidates:
 Courtney Carlson,:
 Bridget Schwartz,:
 Rona Walters,:
Declared:
Did not qualify for ballot:
Endorsements:

3/4G 
01
Candidates:
 Lisa R. Gore,:
Declared:
Did not qualify for ballot:
Endorsements:

02
Candidates:
 Bruce Sherman,:
 John K. Higgins,:
Declared:
Did not qualify for ballot:
Endorsements:

03
Candidates:
 James Nash,:
Declared:
Did not qualify for ballot:
Endorsements:

04
Candidates:
 Michael Zeldin,:
Declared:
Did not qualify for ballot:
Endorsements:

05
Candidates:
 H. Norman Knickle,:
 Peter Lynch,:
Declared:
Did not qualify for ballot:
Endorsements:

06
Candidates:
 Peter Gosselin,:
Declared:
Did not qualify for ballot:
Endorsements:

07
Candidates:
 Zachary Ferguson,:
Declared:
Did not qualify for ballot:
Endorsements:

Ward 4

4A 
01
Candidates:
 Neena Murphy Martin,:
 Paula Y. Edwards,:
Declared:
Did not qualify for ballot:
 Addison Sarter,:
Endorsements:

02
Candidates:
 Joan Hoyte,:
 Stacey Lincoln,:
Declared:
Did not qualify for ballot:
Endorsements:

03
Candidates:
 Stephen A. “Steve” Whatley,:
Declared:
Did not qualify for ballot:
Endorsements:

04
Candidates:
 Patience R. Singleton,:
Declared:
Did not qualify for ballot:
Endorsements:

05
Candidates:
 Kim Patterson,:
 Jonathan La Broi,:
Declared:
Did not qualify for ballot:
Endorsements:

06
Candidates:
Declared:
Did not qualify for ballot:
Endorsements:

07
Candidates:
 Carolyn C. Steptoe,:
Declared:
Did not qualify for ballot:
Endorsements:

4B 
01
Candidates:
 Maxine Davis,:
 T. Michelle Colson,:
Declared:
Did not qualify for ballot:
 Alphonse Canata,:
Endorsements:

02
Candidates:
 Erin Palmer,:
Declared:
Did not qualify for ballot:
Endorsements:

03
Candidates:
 Zurick T. Smith,:
Declared:
Did not qualify for ballot:
Endorsements:

04
Candidates:
 Evan Yeats,:
Declared:
Did not qualify for ballot:
Endorsements:

05
Candidates:
 Kevin Gilligan,:
Declared:
Did not qualify for ballot:
Endorsements:

06
Candidates:
 Tiffani Nichole Johnson,:
Declared:
Did not qualify for ballot:
Endorsements:

07
Candidates:
 M’Bahlia Colson,:
 Michael Cohen,:
Declared:
Did not qualify for ballot:
Endorsements:

08
Candidates:
 Alison Brooks,:
Declared:
Did not qualify for ballot:
Endorsements:

09
Candidates:
 Audrey Walker,:
Declared:
Did not qualify for ballot:
 Mariko Meyer,:
Endorsements:

10
Candidates:
 Stefan A. Nagey,:
 La Roya A. Huff,:
Declared:
Did not qualify for ballot:
Endorsements:

4C 
01
Candidates:
Declared:
Did not qualify for ballot:
Endorsements:

02
Candidates:
 Antonia M. Kirby,:
Declared:
Did not qualify for ballot:
Endorsements:

03
Candidates:
 Thomas P. DeFranco,:
Declared:
Did not qualify for ballot:
Endorsements:

04
Candidates:
 Daniel Alexander,:
Declared:
Did not qualify for ballot:
Endorsements:

05
Candidates:
 Brittany Kademian,:
 Paul Johnson,:
Declared:
Did not qualify for ballot:
Endorsements:

06
Candidates:
 Karen Livingston,:
Declared:
Did not qualify for ballot:
Endorsements:

07
Candidates:
 Matthew Bradfield,:
Declared:
Did not qualify for ballot:
Endorsements:

4D 
01
Candidates:
 Joy A. Pinkey,:
Declared:
Did not qualify for ballot:
Endorsements:

02
Candidates:
 Kate Judson,:
Declared:
Did not qualify for ballot:
Endorsements:

03
Candidates:
 Carson C. Lucarelli,:
Declared:
Did not qualify for ballot:
 Kyle Kelly,:
 Kéthia Clairvoyant,:
Endorsements:

04
Candidates:
 Chrysanthe “CC” Courniotes,:
Declared:
Did not qualify for ballot:
 Richard McLaughlin,:
Endorsements:

05
Candidates:
 Antonio A. Walker,:
 Stephen Marencic Jr.,:
Declared:
Did not qualify for ballot:
Endorsements:

06
Candidates:
 Aman George,:
Declared:
Did not qualify for ballot:
Endorsements:

07
Candidates:
 J. Clark Weigel,:
Declared:
Did not qualify for ballot:
Endorsements:

08
Candidates:
 Anthony Pirrotti,:
Declared:
Did not qualify for ballot:
Endorsements:

4E 
01
Candidates:
 Reginald E. Black Jr.,:
 Vanessa Rubio,:
Declared:
Did not qualify for ballot:
Endorsements:

02
Candidates:
 Marlene Moss,:
Declared:
Did not qualify for ballot:
Endorsements:

03
Candidates:
 Maria Barry,:
Declared:
Did not qualify for ballot:
Withdrew:
 Bobby Curtis King II,:
Endorsements:

04
Candidates:
 Carla Ferris,:
 Randy Zmuda,:
Declared:
Did not qualify for ballot:
Endorsements:

05
Candidates:
 Peggy Pacy,:
 Ulysses E. Campbell,:
Declared:
Did not qualify for ballot:
Endorsements:

06
Candidates:
 Pavan Ishwar Khoobchandani,:
Declared:
Did not qualify for ballot:
Endorsements:

3/4G 
01
Candidates:
 Lisa R. Gore,:
Declared:
Did not qualify for ballot:
Endorsements:

02
Candidates:
 Bruce Sherman,:
 John K. Higgins,:
Declared:
Did not qualify for ballot:
Endorsements:

03
Candidates:
 James Nash,:
Declared:
Did not qualify for ballot:
Endorsements:

04
Candidates:
 Michael Zeldin,:
Declared:
Did not qualify for ballot:
Endorsements:

05
Candidates:
 H. Norman Knickle,:
 Peter Lynch,:
Declared:
Did not qualify for ballot:
Endorsements:

06
Candidates:
 Peter Gosselin,:
Declared:
Did not qualify for ballot:
Endorsements:

07
Candidates:
 Zachary Ferguson,:
Declared:
Did not qualify for ballot:
Endorsements:

Ward 5

5A 
01
Candidates:
 Duvalier J. Malone,:
Declared:
Did not qualify for ballot:
Endorsements:

02
Candidates:
 Karlus Cozart,:
Declared:
Did not qualify for ballot:
Endorsements:

03
Candidates:
 Emily Singer Lucio,:
Declared:
Did not qualify for ballot:
Endorsements:

04
Candidates:
 Diego Rojas,:
Declared:
Did not qualify for ballot:
Endorsements:

05
Candidates:
Declared:
Did not qualify for ballot:
Endorsements:

06
Candidates:
Declared:
Did not qualify for ballot:
 Ila Anita Flannigan,:
Endorsements:

07
Candidates:
Declared:
Did not qualify for ballot:
Endorsements:

08
Candidates:
 Elaine Alston,:
 Gordon-Andrew Fletcher,:
Declared:
Did not qualify for ballot:
Endorsements:

09
Candidates:
 Zachary Ammerman,:
Declared:
Did not qualify for ballot:
Endorsements:

5B 
01
Candidates:
 Gayle Carley,:
 Edward Borrego,:
Declared:
Did not qualify for ballot:
Endorsements:

02
Candidates:
 Nandini Sen,:
Declared:
Did not qualify for ballot:
 Ursula Higgins,:
Endorsements:

03
Candidates:
 Alicia Egolum,:
Declared:
Did not qualify for ballot:
Endorsements:

04
Candidates:
 Ra Amin,:
 Rayseen Woodland,:
Declared:
Did not qualify for ballot:
Endorsements:

05
Candidates:
 Collen Costello,:
 John J. Feeley Jr.,:
Declared:
Did not qualify for ballot:
Endorsements:

06
Candidates:
 Sukhprita “Prita” Piekara,:
Declared:
Did not qualify for ballot:
Endorsements:

07
Candidates:
 Gail Brevard,:
 Justine Pekowski,:
Declared:
Did not qualify for ballot:
Endorsements:

5C 
01
Candidates:
 Antony Dale,:
Declared:
Did not qualify for ballot:
Endorsements:

02
Candidates:
 Lauren Rodgers,:
Declared:
Did not qualify for ballot:
 Ashlee Gates Mercer,:
Endorsements:

03
Candidates:
 Tequia Hicks Delgado,:
Declared:
Did not qualify for ballot:
Endorsements:

04
Candidates:
 Jacqueline Manning,:
 Shawn Nelson,:
Declared:
Did not qualify for ballot:
Endorsements:

05
Candidates:
 Darlene Oliver,:
Declared:
Did not qualify for ballot:
Endorsements:

06
Candidates:
 Harry Thomas Jr.,:
Declared:
Did not qualify for ballot:
Endorsements:

07
Candidates:
 VJ Kapur,:
Declared:
Did not qualify for ballot:
Endorsements:

5D 
01
Candidates:
 Luc Saint-Genies,:
 Rebecca Ryan,:
Declared:
Did not qualify for ballot:
Endorsements:

02
Candidates:
 J. Peter Loftus,:
 Sebrena L. Rhodes,:
Declared:
Did not qualify for ballot:
Endorsements:

03
Candidates:
 Anna Roblin,:
Declared:
Did not qualify for ballot:
Endorsements:

04
Candidates:
 Stephen Cobb,:
Declared:
Did not qualify for ballot:
Endorsements:

05
Candidates:
 Salvador “The Commissioner” Sauceda-Guzman,:
Declared:
Did not qualify for ballot:
Endorsements:

06
Candidates:
 Carrie Dellesky,:
 Kathy Henderson,:
Declared:
Did not qualify for ballot:
Endorsements:

07
Candidates:
 Juan McCullum,:
Declared:
Did not qualify for ballot:
 Jill Perry,:
Endorsements:

08
Candidates:
Declared:
Did not qualify for ballot:
 Juanita Holsendorff,:
Endorsements:

09
Candidates:
Declared:
Did not qualify for ballot:
Endorsements:

5E 
01
Candidates:
 Joyce (Statehood) Robinson-Paul,:
Declared:
Did not qualify for ballot:
Endorsements:

02
Candidates:
 Karla M. Lewis,:
 Nicole McEntee,:
Declared:
Did not qualify for ballot:
Endorsements:

03
Candidates:
 Fred “Phil” Carver,:
Declared:
Did not qualify for ballot:
 Sharon Burns,:
Endorsements:

04
Candidates:
 Bertha G. Holiday,:
 Huma Imtiaz,:
Declared:
Did not qualify for ballot:
Endorsements:

05
Candidates:
 Kevin Rapp,:
Declared:
Did not qualify for ballot:
Withdrew:
 Robert Vinson Brannum,:
Endorsements:

06
Candidates:
 Kirby Vining,:
Declared:
Did not qualify for ballot:
Endorsements:

5F 
01
Candidates:
 Tony Hurst,:
Declared:
Did not qualify for ballot:
Endorsements:

02
Candidates:
 Aru Sahni,:
Declared:
Did not qualify for ballot:
Endorsements:

03
Candidates:
 Patricia Williams (5E),:
Declared:
Did not qualify for ballot:
 Gordon Chaffin,:
Endorsements:

04
Candidates:
 Mark Galvan,:
 Daniel Vega,:
Declared:
Did not qualify for ballot:
Endorsements:

05
Candidates:
 Mary L. Farmer-Allen,:
 Jennifer Anderson,:
Declared:
Did not qualify for ballot:
Endorsements:

06
Candidates:
 Joe Bishop-Henchman,:
Declared:
Did not qualify for ballot:
 Denise L. Wright,:
Endorsements:

07
Candidates:
 Sylvia M. Pinkey,:
 Michele Keegan,:
Declared:
Did not qualify for ballot:
Endorsements:

Ward 6

6A 
01
Candidates:
 Christina Goodlander,:
 Keya Chatterjee,:
Declared:
Did not qualify for ballot:
Endorsements:

02
Candidates:
 Michael Velasquez,:
Declared:
Did not qualify for ballot:
 George Rice,:
Endorsements:

03
Candidates:
 Nicole “Nikki” Delcasale,:
 X,:
Declared:
Did not qualify for ballot:
 Robert Loper,:
Endorsements:

04
Candidates:
 Amber Gove,:
 Alexandra Kelly,:
Declared:
Did not qualify for ballot:
Endorsements:

05
Candidates:
 Laura Gentile,:
Declared:
Did not qualify for ballot:
Endorsements:

06
Candidates:
 Robb Dooling,:
Declared:
Did not qualify for ballot:
Endorsements:

07
Candidates:
 Stephen Moilanen,:
Declared:
Did not qualify for ballot:
Endorsements:

6B 
01
Candidates:
 Frank Avery,:
Declared:
Did not qualify for ballot:
Endorsements:

02
Candidates:
 Gerald Sroufe,:
Declared:
Did not qualify for ballot:
Endorsements:

03
Candidates:
 David Sobelsohn,:
Declared:
Did not qualify for ballot:
Endorsements:

04
Candidates:
 Francis “Frank” D’Andrea,:
Declared:
Did not qualify for ballot:
Endorsements:

05
Candidates:
 Kasie Durkit,:
Declared:
Did not qualify for ballot:
Endorsements:

06
Candidates:
 Chander Jayaraman,:
Declared:
Did not qualify for ballot:
Endorsements:

07
Candidates:
 Vince Mareino,:
Declared:
Did not qualify for ballot:
Endorsements:

08
Candidates:
 Edward Ryder,:
Declared:
Did not qualify for ballot:
Endorsements:

09
Candidates:
 Matt LaFortune,:
Declared:
Did not qualify for ballot:
Endorsements:

6C 
01
Candidates:
 Christy Kwan,:
 Lauren Kurtiz,:
Declared:
Did not qualify for ballot:
Endorsements:

02
Candidates:
 Leslie Merkle,:
Declared:
Did not qualify for ballot:
Endorsements:

03
Candidates:
 Jay Adelstein,:
Declared:
Did not qualify for ballot:
 Rasheedah Hasan,:
Endorsements:

04
Candidates:
 Mark Eckenwiler,:
Declared:
Did not qualify for ballot:
Endorsements:

05
Candidates:
 Joel Kelty,:
Declared:
Did not qualify for ballot:
Endorsements:

06
Candidates:
 Patricia Eguino,:
Declared:
Did not qualify for ballot:
Endorsements:

07
Candidates:
 Tony T. Goodman,:
Declared:
Did not qualify for ballot:
Endorsements:

6D 
01
Candidates:
 Bob Link,:
Declared:
Did not qualify for ballot:
Endorsements:

02
Candidates:
 Thomas Seidman,:
 Ronald R. Collins,:
Declared:
Did not qualify for ballot:
Endorsements:

03
Candidates:
 Gail Fast,:
Declared:
Did not qualify for ballot:
Endorsements:

04
Candidates:
Declared:
Did not qualify for ballot:
Endorsements:

05
Candidates:
 Ashton Rohmer,:
Declared:
Did not qualify for ballot:
 Víctor de León,:
Endorsements:

06
Candidates:
 Bruce Levine,:
Declared:
Did not qualify for ballot:
 Donna Arrendell,:
Endorsements:

07
Candidates:
 Frederica “Rikki” Kramer,:
Declared:
Did not qualify for ballot:
Endorsements:

08
Candidates:
 Rhonda N. Hamilton,:
Declared:
Did not qualify for ballot:
Endorsements:

6E 
01
Candidates:
 Chris Hart,:
Declared:
Did not qualify for ballot:
Endorsements:

02
Candidates:
Declared:
Did not qualify for ballot:
Endorsements:

03
Candidates:
 Kevin M. Rogers,:
Declared:
Did not qualify for ballot:
Endorsements:

04
Candidates:
 Denise E Blackson,:
Declared:
Did not qualify for ballot:
Endorsements:

05
Candidates:
Declared:
Did not qualify for ballot:
Endorsements:

06
Candidates:
Declared:
Did not qualify for ballot:
Endorsements:

07
Candidates:
Declared:
Did not qualify for ballot:
Endorsements:

08
Candidates:
 Misu Tasnim,:
Declared:
Did not qualify for ballot:
Endorsements:

09
Candidates:
Declared:
Did not qualify for ballot:
Endorsements:

6/8F 
01
Candidates:
 Nic Wilson,:
Declared:
Did not qualify for ballot:
Endorsements:

02
Candidates:
 Rick Murphree,:
Write-In Candidates:
 Eric S. Blaylock,:
Declared:
Did not qualify for ballot:
Endorsements:

03
Candidates:
 Andrew McCarthy-Clark,:
 Brian Strege,:
Declared:
Did not qualify for ballot:
Endorsements:

04
Candidates:
 Edward Daniels,:
 Clayton Aristotle,:
 Rosenberg Makeeya Hazelton,:
 Jesse Kamzol,:
Declared:
Did not qualify for ballot:
Endorsements:

05
Candidates:
Declared:
Did not qualify for ballot:
 Sherman Hawkins,:
Withdrew:
 Lonita Sheppard,:
Endorsements:

Ward 7

7B 
01
Candidates:
 John F. Adams,:
Declared:
Did not qualify for ballot:
Endorsements:

02
Candidates:
 Jamaal Maurice Pearsall,:
Declared:
Did not qualify for ballot:
Endorsements:

03
Candidates:
 Travis R. Swanson,:
Declared:
Did not qualify for ballot:
Endorsements:

04
Candidates:
 D.L. Humphrey,:
 David L. Retland,:
Declared:
Did not qualify for ballot:
Endorsements:

05
Candidates:
 Donna Robinson,:
Declared:
Did not qualify for ballot:
Withdrew:
 Dexter Williams,:
Endorsements:

06
Candidates:
 Kelvin Brown,:
Declared:
Did not qualify for ballot:
Endorsements:

07
Candidates:
Declared:
Did not qualify for ballot:
 Tiye Kinlow,:
Endorsements:

08
Candidates:
Declared:
Did not qualify for ballot:
Endorsements:

09
Candidates:
 Pauline B. Scott,:
 Michelle Hammond,:
 Racquel Codling,:
Declared:
Did not qualify for ballot:
Endorsements:

7C 
01
Candidates:
 Brian A. Glover,:
Declared:
Did not qualify for ballot:
Endorsements:

02
Candidates:
 Patricia Williams (7C),:
Declared:
Did not qualify for ballot:
Endorsements:

03
Candidates:
Declared:
Did not qualify for ballot:
 Vince Van,:
Endorsements:

04
Candidates:
 Anthony Lorenzo Green,:
 Julie Levy,:
Declared:
Did not qualify for ballot:
Withdrew:
 Naprisha Taylor,:
Endorsements:

05
Candidates:
 Malik M. Lloyd,:
 Shirley A. Boykins,:
 Mary L. Gaffney,:
Declared:
Did not qualify for ballot:
Endorsements:

06
Candidates:
 Patricia Stamper,:
Declared:
Did not qualify for ballot:
Endorsements:

07
Candidates:
 Dorothy Douglas,:
 Antawan Holmes,:
Declared:
Did not qualify for ballot:
Endorsements:

08
Candidates:
 David Ford,:
 Kimberly Martin,:
Declared:
Did not qualify for ballot:
Endorsements:

09
Candidates:
 Venola M. Rolle,:
 Carrie N. Brown,:
Declared:
Did not qualify for ballot:
Endorsements:

7D 
01
Candidates:
 Siraaj M. Hasan,:
Declared:
Did not qualify for ballot:
Endorsements:

02
Candidates:
Declared:
Did not qualify for ballot:
Endorsements:

03
Candidates:
Declared:
Did not qualify for ballot:
 Wendell Felder,:
Endorsements:

04
Candidates:
 Milton Hardy,:
Declared:
Did not qualify for ballot:
Endorsements:

05
Candidates:
 Ebony Payne,:
Declared:
Did not qualify for ballot:
Withdrew:
 Tamara Blair,:
Endorsements:

06
Candidates:
 Marc Friend,:
Declared:
Did not qualify for ballot:
Endorsements:

07
Candidates:
Declared:
 Brian Voorhees,:
Did not qualify for ballot:
 Carl P. Jordan,:
Endorsements:

08
Candidates:
 Brian Alcorn,:
Declared:
Did not qualify for ballot:
Endorsements:

09
Candidates:
 Shane Seger,:
 Ashley Schapitl,:
Declared:
Did not qualify for ballot:
Endorsements:

10
Candidates:
 Alison Horn,:
Declared:
Did not qualify for ballot:
Endorsements:

7E 
01
Candidates:
Declared:
Did not qualify for ballot:
 Katrina Norman,:
Endorsements:

02
Candidates:
Declared:
Did not qualify for ballot:
Endorsements:

03
Candidates:
 Beverly F. Smith,:
Declared:
Did not qualify for ballot:
Endorsements:

04
Candidates:
 Natasha Dupee,:
Declared:
Did not qualify for ballot:
Endorsements:

05
Candidates:
Declared:
Did not qualify for ballot:
 Tim Howard,:
Endorsements:

06
Candidates:
 Delia Houseal,:
Declared:
Did not qualify for ballot:
Endorsements:

07
Candidates:
Declared:
Did not qualify for ballot:
Endorsements:

7F 
01
Candidates:
 Tyrell M. Holcomb,:
Declared:
Did not qualify for ballot:
Endorsements:

02
Candidates:
 Obbie English III,:
 Zewdi Alem,:
 Ashley R. Ruff,:
Declared:
Did not qualify for ballot:
Endorsements:

03
Candidates:
 Kimory KSO Orendoff,:
Declared:
Did not qualify for ballot:
 Rebecca J. Morris,:
Endorsements:

04
Candidates:
Declared:
Did not qualify for ballot:
Endorsements:

05
Candidates:
 Brittany N. Hughes,:
 Clyde Darren Thompson,:
Declared:
Did not qualify for ballot:
Endorsements:

06
Candidates:
Declared:
Did not qualify for ballot:
Endorsements:

07
Candidates:
 Shirley Thompson-Wright,:
 Devon Myers,:
 Beatrice (Bebe) Evans,:
Declared:
Did not qualify for ballot:
Endorsements:

08
Candidates:
Declared:
Did not qualify for ballot:
Endorsements:

Ward 8

8A 
01
Candidates:
 Tonya “Ms. Tonya” Crawford,:
Declared:
Did not qualify for ballot:
 Tom Donohue,:
Endorsements:

02
Candidates:
 Elizabeth Carter,:
 Barbara J. Clark,:
 Mohamed K. Azab,:
Declared:
Did not qualify for ballot:
Endorsements:

03
Candidates:
 Holly Muhammad,:
 Bobby “Slli’m” Williams,:
Declared:
Did not qualify for ballot:
Endorsements:

04
Candidates:
 Moses Smith,:
 Laneice Moore,:
Declared:
Did not qualify for ballot:
Endorsements:

05
Candidates:
 Jamila White,:
Declared:
Did not qualify for ballot:
Endorsements:

06
Candidates:
 Robin McKinney,:
Declared:
Did not qualify for ballot:
Endorsements:

07
Candidates:
Declared:
Did not qualify for ballot:
Endorsements:

8B 
01
Candidates:
 Takema Keyes,:
 Khadijah Watson,:
Declared:
Did not qualify for ballot:
Endorsements:

02
Candidates:
 Paul Trantham,:
Declared:
Did not qualify for ballot:
Endorsements:

03
Candidates:
Declared:
Did not qualify for ballot:
Endorsements:

04
Candidates:
 Kevin B. Coleman,:
 Kimberly Little,:
Declared:
Did not qualify for ballot:
 Terri L. Acker,:
Endorsements:

05
Candidates:
 Joseph B. Johnson,:
Declared:
Did not qualify for ballot:
Endorsements:

06
Candidates:
 George Reid,:
 Alyce K. McFarland,:
Declared:
Did not qualify for ballot:
 Matthew Coleman,:
Endorsements:

07
Candidates:
Declared:
Did not qualify for ballot:
 Rhonda L. Edwards-Hines,:
Endorsements:

8C 
01
Candidates:
 Victoria Akinseye,:
 Georgette Joy Johnson,:
Declared:
Did not qualify for ballot:
Endorsements:

02
Candidates:
 Myeasha “My Ty” Smith,:
 Joyce M. Doyle,:
 Kwasi Seitu,:
Declared:
Did not qualify for ballot:
Endorsements:

03
Candidates:
 Dascha Cleckley,:
 Rufaro Jenkins,:
Declared:
Did not qualify for ballot:
Endorsements:

04
Candidates:
 Erica “Go” Green,:
 Lenwood “Lenny” Johnson,:
Declared:
Did not qualify for ballot:
 Shelena Hollinger,:
Endorsements:

05
Candidates:
 Anthony Muhammad,:
 Cheryl Moore,:
 Allyson Carpenter,:
Declared:
Did not qualify for ballot:
Endorsements:

06
Candidates:
 Robbie “The Advocate” Woodland,:
 Markus Batchelor,:
 Betty Murray,:
Declared:
Did not qualify for ballot:
Endorsements:

07
Candidates:
 Salim Adofo,:
Declared:
Did not qualify for ballot:
Endorsements:

08
Candidates:
 Amanda Beale,:
 Jacob C. Brown,:
Declared:
Did not qualify for ballot:
Endorsements:

8D 
01
Candidates:
Declared:
Did not qualify for ballot:
Endorsements:

02
Candidates:
Declared:
Did not qualify for ballot:
Endorsements:

03
Candidates:
Declared:
Did not qualify for ballot:
Endorsements:

04
Candidates:
Declared:
Did not qualify for ballot:
Endorsements:

05
Candidates:
 Trayvon “Ward 8” Hawkins,:
 Monique T. Diop,:
Declared:
Did not qualify for ballot:
Endorsements:

06
Candidates:
 Wendy “Hope Dealer” Hamilton,:
 Maria Johnson,:
Declared:
Did not qualify for ballot:
Endorsements:

07
Candidates:
Declared:
Did not qualify for ballot:
Endorsements:

08
Candidates:
 Deloris Walker,:
 Lakiah Williams,:
 Melody Moore,:
Declared:
Did not qualify for ballot:
Endorsements:

8E 
01
Candidates:
 Lacey Cleckley,:
 Deborah Wells,:
Declared:
Did not qualify for ballot:
Endorsements:

02
Candidates:
 LaQueda Tate,:
Declared:
Did not qualify for ballot:
 Shayla Mack,:
Endorsements:

03
Candidates:]
 Shekita “Ki-Ki” McBroom,:
 Kelly Mikel Williams,:
Declared:
Did not qualify for ballot:
Endorsements:

04
Candidates:
 Shaquan “Living Proof” Hudson,:
 Kendall Simmons,:
 Veronica Adams,:
Declared:
Did not qualify for ballot:
Endorsements:

05
Candidates:
 Duane A. Moody,:
Declared:
Did not qualify for ballot:
Endorsements:

06
Candidates:
 Dolores “Miracle” Bryant,:
 Karlene “K” Armstead,:
Declared:
Did not qualify for ballot:
 Prokoshia Long,:
Endorsements:

07
Candidates:
Declared:
Did not qualify for ballot:
Endorsements:

08
Candidates:
 Rowena “Joyce” Scott,:
Declared:
Did not qualify for ballot:
Endorsements:

09
Candidates:
Declared:
Did not qualify for ballot:
Endorsements:

6/8F 
01
Candidates:
 Nic Wilson,:
Declared:
Did not qualify for ballot:
Endorsements:

02
Candidates:
 Rick Murphree,:
Write-In Candidates:
 Eric S. Blaylock,:
Declared:
Did not qualify for ballot:
Endorsements:

03
Candidates:
 Andrew McCarthy-Clark,:
 Brian Strege,:
Declared:
Did not qualify for ballot:
Endorsements:

04
Candidates:
 Edward Daniels,:
 Clayton Aristotle,:
 Rosenberg Makeeya Hazelton,:
 Jesse Kamzol,:
Declared:
Did not qualify for ballot:
Endorsements:

05
Candidates:
Declared:
Did not qualify for ballot:
 Sherman Hawkins,:
Withdrew:
 Lonita Sheppard,:
Endorsements:

See also

 Neighborhoods in Washington, D.C.

References

External links
 Advisory Neighborhood Commissions
 DC Board of Elections and Ethics
 Run for ANC
 ANC Finder
 ANC Election Resource
Government of the District of Columbia